Lee Jung-Jin Also known as YouTuber "JFootballTV" (born 23 December 1993) is a South Korean footballer, who plays as a winger for CE Mataró and previously played for the likes of Busan IPark, Gangwon FC,Yeoju Citizen FC and Bangkok F.C..

Early life 
Lee Jeong-jin learned to play football on the school team at Cheongdam High School, he continued his football aspirations well into university as he attended Donggang University and Pai Chai University.

Club career 
Lee signed with Busan IPark on January 21, 2016, he made a total of 14 appearances with Busan IPark. He made his debut for the club on the 13th April 2016 in a 2–1 defeat to Seoul E-Land, and his first goal came in a 4–0 victory over Chungju on July 10. In January 2017, he transferred to Gangwon FC, then in January 2018 made a transfer to Cheonan City FC making 3 appearances in his 2 seasons there. February 2019 he made a move to Yeoju Citizen FC making 6 appearances. In February 2021 he made his infamous move to MOF Customs United F.C., were he made 6 appearances in his 5 month stay. Then in July of the same year he made a move to Bangkok F.C. for a rumoured 125$. He has made 3 appearances so far and scored his first two goals in a 2-0 victory over Prime Bangkok F.C. on October 6. On October 27 he scored his third goal in a 3-0 victory over See Khwae City FC. Lee transferred over to the Hessenliga with SV Neuhof in 2022, playing in only two appearances. He went on to move to Spanish side CE Mataró for the 2022–23 Primera Catalana season.

Career statistics 
As of 13 March 2023.

References

1993 births
Living people
Association football midfielders
South Korean footballers
Busan IPark players
K League 2 players